Dark Love is a 2010 Italian drama film directed by Antonio Capuano. It premiered out of competition at the 67th Venice International Film Festival.

Plot
Irene (De Angelis) is a well-to-do young woman who is gang-raped by a quartet of thuggish Neapolitan teenage boys. One of them, Ciro (Agrio) begins a correspondence with her after his conviction, as both victim and victimiser seek catharsis through artistic expression.

Cast 
Irene De Angelis: Irene
Gabriele Agrio: Ciro
Luisa Ranieri: Mother of Irene 
Corso Salani: Father of Irene 
Valeria Golino: Prison psychologist 
Anna Ammirati: Irene's analyst 
Fabrizio Gifuni: Psychotherapist

References

External links

2010 films
Italian crime drama films
2010 crime drama films
Films directed by Antonio Capuano
Films about rape
2010s Italian films